A virtual console (VC) – also known as a virtual terminal (VT) – is a conceptual combination of the keyboard and display for a computer user interface. It is a feature of some Unix-like operating systems such as Linux, BSD, illumos, UnixWare, and macOS in which the system console of the computer can be used to switch between multiple virtual consoles to access unrelated user interfaces. Virtual consoles date back at least to Xenix and Concurrent CP/M in the 1980s.

In the Linux console and other platforms, usually the first six virtual consoles provide a text terminal with a login prompt to a Unix shell. The graphical X Window System traditionally starts in the seventh virtual console (tty7), although this is configuration dependent.
In Linux, the user switches between them by pressing the Alt key combined with a function key – for example  +  to access the virtual console number 1.  +  changes to the previous virtual console and  +  to the next virtual console. To switch from the X Window System or a Wayland compositor,  +  +  works. (Note that users can redefine these default key combinations.)

If several sessions of the X Window System are required to run in parallel, such as in the case of fast user switching or when debugging X programs on a separate X server, each X session usually runs in a separate virtual console.

Implementation details

Unix systems
Unix workstations, such as those manufactured by Sun or Silicon Graphics, did not include virtual consoles. The only purpose of a console would be to fix the system so that the graphical environment could start.

Sun Niagara-based servers running virtualization with Logical Domains get virtual console services from the Control domain.

See also
 Virtual desktop, works similar to a virtual console, but operates on graphical desktops instead of a command prompt
 System console for the non-virtual console
 Text terminal for the textual interface in general
 Pseudo terminal for even more virtual consoles
 Terminal emulator for an application program that has the same function as a textual virtual console

Notes

References
 FreeBSD Handbook, chapter 3.2 Virtual Consoles and Terminals

External links
 The Linux keyboard and console HOWTO
 Linux command chvt to switch vt from cmdline 
 XENIX -- Microsoft's Short-lived Love Affair with Unix

Computer terminals
Terminal multiplexers
User interfaces